This is a list of the first women lawyer(s) and judge(s) in Australia and Oceania. It includes the year in which the women were admitted to practice law (in parentheses). Also included are the first women in their country to achieve a certain distinction such as obtaining a law degree.

KEY

 AUS = External territory of Australia
FRA = Administrative division of France
 GBR = British overseas territory of the United Kingdom
NZL = Associated state or dependent territory of New Zealand
 USA = Associate state or territory of the United States of America

American Samoa (USA) 
See List of first women lawyers and judges in the Territories of the U.S. for more details.

Australia 

Ada Evans: First female law graduate in Australia (1902)
Flos Greig (1905): First female barrister in Australia 
Agnes McWhinney (1915): First female solicitor in Australia (upon being called to the Queensland Bar)
Edith Cowan: First female magistrate in Australia (1920)
Elizabeth Evatt (1956): First female appointed as a Judge of the Family Court of Australia and serve as its Chief Justice (1976)
Mahla Pearlman (1960): First female appointed as a Chief Judge of any jurisdiction in Australia (upon her appointed as the Chief Judge of the Land and Environment Court of New South Wales in 1992)
Roma Mitchell (1962): First female judge in Australia (1965). She was also the first female Queen's Counsel (QC) in South Australia and Governor of South Australia (1991).
Mary Gaudron (1968): First female appointed as a Justice of the High Court in Australia (1987), as well as the first female Solicitor-General in Australia (upon her appointment to the position in New South Wales in 1981). She was also the first female Queen's Counsel (QC) in New South Wales (1981). 
Diana Bryant (1970): First female appointed as the Chief Federal Magistrate of Australia (2000)
Deidre O'Connor (1974): First female appointed as a Judge of the Federal Court of Australia (1990)
Marilyn Warren (1975): First female justice appointed as a Chief Justice in Australia (upon her appointment as the Chief Justice of the Supreme Court of Victoria in 2003)
Susan Kiefel (1975): First female justice appointed as the Chief Justice of the High Court of Australia (2016). She was also the first female Queen's Counsel (QC) in Queensland and the first female appointed as a Justice of the Norfolk Island Supreme Court (2004).
 Margaret McMurdo (1976): First female to serve as the president of an appellate court in Australia (upon her appointment as the President of the Queensland Court of Appeal in 1998)
Catherine Branson (c. 1977): First female to become a Crown Solicitor in Australia (1984)
 Norah Hartnett, Christine Mead, Judy Ryan: First females appointed as Federal Magistrates for what is now the Federal Circuit Court of Australia (2000)

Cook Islands (NZL) 

Tina Pupuke Browne (1981): First female registered (before the High Court) as a practicing lawyer in the Cook Islands
Janet Maki: First female Solicitor General in the Cook Islands (c. 1998), as well as the first female Ombudsman in the Cook Islands (c. 2006)
Christine Grice: First female judge in the Cook Islands (2007)

Federated States of Micronesia (USA) 

Janet Healy Weeks: First female lawyer and judge (1982) in Micronesia
Beauleen Carl-Worswick (1992): First Micronesian female lawyer, as well as the first female Justice of the Supreme Court of the Federated States of Micronesia (2010)
Marstella Jack: First female appointed as an Attorney General in the Federated States of Micronesia (2005)

Fiji 

 Patricia Hackett (1936): First female lawyer to take out a practicing lawyer's certificate in Fiji
 Mere Pulea: First Fijian female to earn a law degree. She was later appointed as a Judge of the High Court of Fiji. 
 Vusega Helu: First female (of Tongan descent) magistrate in Fiji (c. 1980s) 
 Nazhat Shameem (1983): First female judge (who is of Indo-Fijian descent) in Fiji (upon her appointment as a Judge of the High Court of Fiji in 1999). She was also the first woman lawyer in Fiji's Department of Public Prosecutions. 
 Laurel Vaurasi: First female to serve as the President of the Fiji Law Society (2014) 
Ana Tuiketei: First Fijian female elected to the International Criminal Court in The Hague, Netherlands (2020)

French Polynesia (FRA) 

Denise Goupil (1961): First female lawyer in French Polynesia. In 1977, she became the first female to serve as the Bâtonnier of the Papeete Bar Association.
Marie-France Luneau: First female juvenile court judge in French Polynesia (upon her appointment to the Papeete Court of First Instance in 1984)
Andrée Conre: First female to serve as the First President of the Court of Appeal of French Polynesia (Papeete) (1994)

Guam (USA) 
See List of first women lawyers and judges in the Territories of the U.S. for more details.

Kiribati 
Dame Roma Mitchell: First female Justice of the Kiribati Court of Appeal (1987)
Pole Atanraoi-Reim (1992): First female lawyer in Kiribati
Tetiro Semilota: First female Attorney-General of Kiribati (2016). She became the first i-Kiribati (female) to serve as the acting Chief Justice of Kiribati in 2022.
Tekatau Bio (2021): First i-Kiribati (female) admitted as a barrister and solicitor to the High Court of New Zealand

Marshall Islands (USA) 
 Rosalie Konou (1983): First female lawyer in the Marshall Islands
Grace Lokboj-Leban: First female appointed as a full-time Judge of the Traditional Rights Court in Marshall Islands (2010) and serve as its Chief Judge (2020)
Vanessa Tzoannos: First Greek (female) lawyer qualified to practice law in the Marshall Islands (2019)

Nauru 

 Barina Waqa: First female lawyer in Nauru
 I.V. Helu-Mocelutu: First female appointed as the Resident Magistrate in Nauru (1990)
 Jane Hamilton-White (1998): First female judge of Nauru (upon her appointment as a Justice of the Supreme Court of Nauru in 2014)

New Caledonia (FRA) 

Solange Drollet (1971): First female lawyer to open a law office in New Caledonia (1974)
Thérèse Pelletier (1977): First female admitted to practice law in New Caledonia per the Nouméa Bar Association's records
Renée Reuter: First female to serve as the President of the Bar of Noumea (Bâtonnier au Barreau de Nouméa)
Augusta Filippi: First female to serve as the President of the Nouméa Court of Appeal (1979) [jurisdiction over New Caledonia and Wallis and Futuna]
Annie Brunet-Fuster: First female to serve as an Attorney General in New Caledonia (upon becoming the Attorney General of the Nouméa Court of Appeal; her service ended in 2015)
Nadine Pidjot (2017): First Kanak female lawyer in New Caledonia (upon being called to the Bar of Nouméa)
Estelle Sitrita-Streeter: First Kanak female judicial officer in New Caledonia (2020)

New Zealand 

 Ethel Benjamin (1897): First female barrister and solicitor in New Zealand (and in the British Empire)
 Harriette Vine (1915): First woman to graduate with a degree in law from Victoria University of Wellington
 Augusta Wallace (1954): First female judge in New Zealand (1975)
 Shirley Smith (1957): First woman to be a full member of a law faculty at a New Zealand university (at Victoria University of Wellington)
Una Jagose (1960): First female to serve as the Solicitor-General of New Zealand (2016)
 Silvia Cartwright (1967): First female appointed as a Judge of the Chief District Court (1989) and Judge of the High Court (1993)
 Sian Elias (1970): First female justice appointed as the Chief Justice of New Zealand (1999) and one of the first female Queen's Counsel (alongside Lowell Goddard) in New Zealand
 Georgina te Heuheu (1971): First Māori female lawyer in New Zealand
 Judith Potter: First female to serve as the President of the New Zealand Law Society (1990)
 Lowell Goddard (1975): First Māori female appointed as a Judge of the High Court in New Zealand (1995)
Mele Tuilotolava (1982): First Pacific Islander female lawyer in New Zealand
 Margaret Wilson: First female lawyer to become the Attorney-General of New Zealand (1999-2005)
 Caren Fox: First Māori female appointed as a Judge of the Māori Land Court (2000) and Deputy Chief Judge (2010) in New Zealand
 Denise Clark (1985): First Māori female appointed as a Judge of the District Court in New Zealand (2001)

Niue (NZL) 
Sarah Reeves (1985): First female appointed as a Judge of the High Court of Niue (2014)

Norfolk Island (AUS) 

Susan Kiefel (Queensland Bar, 1975): First female appointed as a Justice of the Norfolk Island Supreme Court (2004)
 Piria Coleman: First Norfolk Island woman to practice law in Norfolk Island (2012)

Northern Mariana Islands (USA) 
See List of first women lawyers and judges in the Territories of the U.S. for more details.

Palau 

 Ernestine Rengiil (1987): First Palauan female lawyer in Palau. She is also known as the first Palauan female to serve as the Attorney General of Palau (1992).
 Janet Healy Weeks: First female to serve as a part-time associate judge in Palau (1993)
 Jerrlyn Uduch Sengebau Senior: First female judge in Palau (upon her appointment as an Associate Judge of the Land Court in 1999)
 Kathleen M. Salii: First female appointed as an Associate Justice of the Palau Supreme Court (2000)
 Lourdes F. Materne: First female appointed as a Senior Judge of the Palau Court of Common Pleas (2003)

Papua New Guinea 

Hilda Maddocks (1948): First woman to practice as a barrister and solicitor for the Supreme Court of Papua New Guinea
Meg Taylor: First female lawyer in Papua New Guinea
Teresa Doherty: First female to serve as a Councillor of the PNG Law Society and judge in Papua New Guinea (upon her appointment on an acting basis to the Supreme Court of Papua New Guinea in 1988). She is considered the first female judge in the South Pacific.
 Catherine Davani (1984): First native female to serve as a Justice of the Supreme Court of Papua New Guinea (2001)
 Nerrie Eliakim: First female appointed as a Chief Magistrate in Papua New Guinea (2013)

Pitcairn Islands (GBR) 

Jane Lovell-Smith: First female to serve as a Judge of the Supreme Court of the Pitcairn Islands (2004)
Judith Potter (1965): First female (a New Zealander) appointed as a Judge of the Pitcairn Court of Appeal (2012) (Pitcairn Islands)

Samoa 

Olive Nelson (1938): First female barrister and solicitor in Samoa
 Brenda Heather-Latu (New Zealand, 1987): First female appointed as the Attorney General of Samoa (1997)
 Mata Keli Tuatagaloa: First native female judge in Samoa (upon her appointment as a Judge of the District Court of Samoa in 2011). She later became the first female Justice of the Supreme Court of Samoa (2015).
 Mareva Betham-Annandale: First female elected as the President of the Samoa Law Society (c. 2014)

Solomon Islands 

 Patricia Hackett: First female solicitor in the Solomon Islands  (c. 1936)
 Jean Gordon, Nuatali Tongarutu, and Maelyn Bird: First female lawyers in the Solomon Islands (c. 1980s). Tongarutu became the first female to serve as the Acting Attorney General of the Solomon Islands (2006-2007), and Bird went on to become the first native female to serve as a Judge of the High Court of Solomon Islands (2019).
 Ester Lelapitu: First female appointed as a magistrate in the Solomon Islands (1999)
 Jane Hamilton-White: First female appointed as the Principal Magistrate of the Solomon Islands (c. 2003-2005)
 Nkemdilim Izuako: First female judge in the Solomon Islands (upon her appointment to the High Court of Solomon Islands in 2006)
 Emma Garo: First female appointed as a Principal Magistrate in the Central Magistrates Court (2007) and the Chief Magistrate of the Solomon Islands (2017). Garo is also known as one of the first qualified female lawyers in the Solomon Islands.
 Katalaini Ziru: First female elected as the President of the Solomon Islands Bar Association (2014)
 Margaret Wilson: First female to serve as a Judge of the Solomon Islands Court of Appeal (2014)
 Rachel Subusola Olutimayin: First female to serve as Solomon Islands' Director of Public Prosecutions (2019)

Tokelau (NZL) 

Sian Elias (1970): First female justice appointed as the Chief Justice of Tokelau (1999) (Tokelau)
Lise Hope Suveinakama: First Tokelau (female) admitted as a barrister and solicitor before the High Court of New Zealand (Waikato) (c. 2000)

Tonga 

'Ana Kata Nau: First female lawyer in Tonga
‘Iunaise Vusenga Helu: First female magistrate in Tonga
'Alisi Afeaki Taumoepeau: First female appointed as the Attorney General of Tonga (2006-2009)
Linda Folaumoetu'i: First female to serve as a Law Lord (2017) and the Attorney General of Tonga without also being the Minister of Justice (2019)
'Elisapeti Langi and Petunia Tupou: First females appointed as an acting and permanent Justice respectively of the Supreme Court of Tonga (2020 and 2022)

Tuvalu 

 Joelle Grover: First female (an Australian) appointed as The People's Lawyer in Tuvalu (2007-2009) (Tuvalu)
Eselealofa "Ese" Apinelu: First Tuvaluan female lawyer, as well as the first female Attorney General of Tuvalu (2008- )
Judith Potter: First female to serve as a Judge of the Court of Appeal of Tuvalu (2014)
Filiga Taukiei Niko: First Tuvaluan female appointed as The People's Lawyer in Tuvalu (2015- )
According to Kofe and Taomia (2007), women have served as Island Court magistrates in Tuvalu though their names were not identified.

Vanuatu 

 Heather Lini-Leo Matas: First indigenous female lawyer in Vanuatu
 Rita Naviti: First female magistrate in Vanuatu (1993)
Kayleen Tavoa: First female Public Prosecutor in Vanuatu (2005-2014)
Mary Sey: First female judge in Vanuatu (upon serving on the Supreme Court of Vanuatu from 2012-2017)
Viran Molisa Trief: First female Solicitor General of Vanuatu (2009-2016) and first Ni-Vanuatu woman appointed to the Supreme Court of Vanuatu (2019)

See also 

Justice ministry 
List of first women lawyers and judges by nationality
 List of first women lawyers and judges in Africa
 List of first women lawyers and judges in Asia
 List of first women lawyers and judges in Europe
 List of first women lawyers and judges in North America
 List of first women lawyers and judges in South America
 List of first women lawyers and judges in the United States
 List of the first women appointed to Australian judicial positions
 List of the first women holders of political offices in Oceania

References

Women, Australia, Oceania
Lawyers, Australia, Oceania
Lawyers
Women, lawyers
Women in Oceania
Law in Oceania